The 61st Cavalry Division was an Organized Reserve cavalry unit of the United States Army.

It was created in 1921 from the perceived need for additional cavalry units after World War I, and was numbered in succession of the Regular Army Divisions, which were not all active at its creation. The 61st was officially disbanded on 30 January 1942, although most of its personnel had been reassigned in 1941. The unit was nicknamed "The Foragers".

The Division was composed of personnel from New York and New Jersey. The Division Headquarters was initially located in Rochester, New York, but moved to New York City in 1922.

Organization
In early 1940, the division included the following units:
Headquarters (Manhattan)
Headquarters, Special Troops (Rochester)
Headquarters Troop (Manhattan)
61st Signal Troop (Buffalo)
581st Ordnance Company (Medium) (Buffalo)
461st Tank Company (Light) (Manhattan)
 151st Cavalry Brigade (Rochester)
  301st Cavalry Regiment (Rochester)
  302nd Cavalry Regiment (Newark)
 152nd Cavalry Brigade (Manhattan)
  303rd Cavalry Regiment (Manhattan)
  304th Cavalry Regiment (Manhattan)
 861st Field Artillery Regiment (New York City)
 461st Reconnaissance Squadron (reorganized from the 151st Machine Gun Squadron in 1929) (Albany)
 401st Engineer Squadron (New York City)
 361st Medical Squadron (Albany)
 461st Quartermaster Squadron (Rochester)

Notable personnel
 William J. Donovan was the first commanding officer of the 301st Cavalry Regiment. 
 Terry de la Mesa Allen served as the executive officer of the 303rd Cavalry Regiment. 
 Brice Pursell Disque commanded the 151st Cavalry Brigade from 6 June 1922, to 14 April 1937. From 15 April 1937, to June 1939, he commanded the 152nd Cavalry Brigade.

See also 
 United States Army branch insignia
 List of armored and cavalry regiments of the United States Army

References

Citations

Bibliography 
 
 
 
 
”, The Trading Post, Journal of the American Society of Military Insignia Collectors, April- June 2009, page 21

External links
Formations of the United States Army

61
Military units and formations established in 1921
Military units and formations disestablished in 1942